The Norbert Wiener Prize in Applied Mathematics is a $5000 prize awarded, every three years, for an outstanding contribution to "applied mathematics in the highest and broadest sense." It was endowed in 1967 in honor of Norbert Wiener by MIT's mathematics department and is provided jointly by the American Mathematical Society and Society for Industrial and Applied Mathematics. The recipient of the prize has to be a member of one of the awarding societies.

Winners 
 1970: Richard E. Bellman
 1975: Peter D. Lax
 1980: Tosio Kato and Gerald B. Whitham
 1985: Clifford S. Gardner
 1990: Michael Aizenman and Jerrold E. Marsden
 1995: Hermann Flaschka and Ciprian Foias
 2000: Alexandre J. Chorin and Arthur Winfree
 2004: James A. Sethian
 2007: Craig Tracy and Harold Widom
 2010: David Donoho
 2013: Andrew Majda
 2016: Constantine M. Dafermos 
 2019: Marsha Berger and Arkadi Nemirovski
 2022: Eitan Tadmor

See also

 List of mathematics awards
 Prizes named after people

External links 
 AMS webpage for the prize
 SIAM webpage for the prize

Awards of the American Mathematical Society
Awards established in 1967
Triennial events
Awards of the Society for Industrial and Applied Mathematics